On 20 May 1992, Brian Schlaepfer murdered six members of his family on their Paerata farm, near Pukekohe, Auckland Region, New Zealand before he shot himself. The massacre was one of the most high-profile shootings in New Zealand's history.

Murders 
Schlaepfer, who suffered from mild depression, quarreled with his wife in their bedroom before stabbing her to death with a knife. One of his sons went to investigate the noise of the fight and was shot. Schlaepfer then went to the barn where he shot his other son. The wife of one of his sons went from another house to search for the origin of the gunshots  and was wounded by shots on the way to the house where the murders had taken place. She ran to her house and called the police on the emergency telephone number (111). 

Schlaepfer next shot and stabbed his grandson in his bed, then shot his son's wife in the kitchen while she was talking to the police. Schlaepfer then returned to the barn where he shot his son and waited for his other son to return from work. Schlaepfer shot and stabbed him when he arrived, then went to the bushes near the house and shot himself. Schlaepfer's granddaughter, who had hidden from him in a wardrobe, survived the shooting of her mother and continued speaking to police on the emergency line for three hours, describing what was happening at the scene until it was secured by police. Schlaepfer used a shotgun and a .22-calibre rifle during the shooting.

Gun control context 
At the time of the event, gun owners were still regulated under the Arms Act 1983, which granted lifetime licences. New Zealand legislation to amend the act in order to review licences every 10 years (a consequence of the 1990 Aramoana massacre) had not yet been enacted. Thomas Thorp considered the Schlaepfer murders in his comprehensive 1995 Review of Firearms Control in New Zealand for the New Zealand Government. Thorp found that Schlaepfer had been issued with a class A firearms licence in 1984 and had no known history of mental illness or domestic violence according to police records.

See also 
Aramoana massacre
Arms Act 1983
Raurimu massacre

References

Further reading

External links 

  - Podcast
  - Auckland Libraries references to newspaper cuttings and books.

1990s mass shootings in New Zealand
1992 murders in New Zealand
1992 in New Zealand
Deaths by firearm in New Zealand
Massacres in 1992
Massacres in New Zealand
May 1992 crimes
May 1992 events in New Zealand
Spree shootings in New Zealand
Family murders
History of the Auckland Region
Mass shootings in New Zealand